Isamu Osugi  is a Japanese mixed martial artist.

Mixed martial arts record

|-
| Loss
| align=center| 0-5
| Kazunari Murakami
| Submission (armlock)
| Lumax Cup: Tournament of J '96
| 
| align=center| 1
| align=center| 4:10
| Japan
| 
|-
| Loss
| align=center| 0-4
| Masanori Suda
| Submission (armbar)
| Shooto: Vale Tudo Junction 2
| 
| align=center| 2
| align=center| 2:57
| Tokyo, Japan
| 
|-
| Loss
| align=center| 0-3
| Tomoaki Hayama
| Submission (guillotine choke)
| Shooto: Tokyo Free Fight
| 
| align=center| 2
| align=center| 2:10
| Tokyo, Japan
| 
|-
| Loss
| align=center| 0-2
| Yuichi Otsuka
| Submission (armbar)
| Lumax Cup: Tournament of J '95
| 
| align=center| 1
| align=center| 0:42
| Japan
| 
|-
| Loss
| align=center| 0-1
| Rumina Sato
| Technical Submission (flying reverse triangle choke)
| Shooto: Vale Tudo Perception
| 
| align=center| 1
| align=center| 2:01
| Setagaya, Tokyo, Japan
|

See also
List of male mixed martial artists

References

External links
 
 Isamu Osugi at mixedmartialarts.com

Japanese male mixed martial artists
Living people
Year of birth missing (living people)